Balkan Folklore Festival or Balkan festival of folk songs and dances is an international folk festival in Ohrid, North Macedonia. It was founded in 1962 and represents the oldest manifestation of its kind in the Balkans. At that festival many vocal and instrumental artistic groups and solosingers present the authentic tradition and culture throughout the dances, songs, customs, traditional clothes and instruments. Traditionally, the festival is held at the beginning of July.

References

External links

Music festivals established in 1962 
Ohrid
Summer festivals 
1962 establishments in the Socialist Republic of Macedonia
Folk festivals in North Macedonia
Summer events in North Macedonia